San Giuseppe Vesuviano is a comune (municipality) in the  Metropolitan City of Naples in  Italy, region Campania, located about 20 km east of Naples.

Sights include the sanctuary dedicated to St. Joseph that stands in the center of the city.

San Giuseppe Vesuviano borders the following municipalities: Ottaviano, Palma Campania, Poggiomarino, San Gennaro Vesuviano, Terzigno.

Notable People 
Michele Miranda, former Consigliere for the Genovese Crime Family

References

External links
 Official website

Cities and towns in Campania